Ellen Schwiers (11 June 1930 – 26 April 2019) was a German actress of stage, film, and television. She was featured in world premieres of plays by Dürrenmatt and Frisch at the Schauspielhaus Zürich, and appeared as Buhlschaft in Jedermann at the Salzburg Festival. In a career from 1949 to 2015, she also appeared in more than 200 films and television shows, including popular series such as Tatort. She also directed plays, founded a touring theatre company in 1982, and was Intendant of a festival from 1984.

Career
Her earliest theatre engagement was at the Theater Koblenz from 1949, and she was then engaged by Heinz Hilpert at the Theater Göttingen in 1953. Her first major role was the title role in Lessing's Minna von Barnhelm. She played in the world premieres of Dürrenmatt's  and Frisch's  at the Schauspielhaus Zürich. She was internationally recognised for playing Buhlschaft in Jedermann at the Salzburg Festival in 1961 and 1962, a role that she also played in a 1961 film, alongside Walther Reyer in the title role.

Schwiers appeared in more than 200 television productions, including popular series such as Tatort, Der rote Schal and Doktor Martin.

In 1984, she became Intendant of the festival.

Schwiers married Peter Jacob in 1956. Their daughter Katerina Jacob also became an actress. Their son Daniel, also an actor, died of cancer in 1985 at the age of 21. She is also the grandmother of Josephine Jacob. Schwiers founded a touring theatre company with her husband and daughter, Das Ensemble, which she kept running after her husband's death in 1992, and then passed to her daughter. She last appeared on stage at the age of 84 in the comedy Altweiberfrühling, with her daughter and her brother .

Schwiers died at her home in Starnberg on 26 April 2019.

Selected filmography
She appeared in more than 60 films, including:

 Bandits of the Autobahn (1955)
 Between Time and Eternity (1956) 
 The King of Bernina (1957)
 The Story of Anastasia (1956), as Princess Katharina
 Arms and the Man (1958), as Louka
 The Cow and I (1959), as Josépha
 When the Bells Sound Clearly (1959)
 Med mord i bagaget (1959), as Nina Christians
 Gustav Adolf's Page (1960)
 The Last Witness (1960), as Ingrid Bernhardy
 The Inheritance of Bjorndal (1960), as Gunvor
 Jedermann (1961), as Buhlschaft
 The Brain (1962), as Ella
 God's Thunder (1965), as Françoise
 The Bandits of the Rio Grande (1965), as Lida 
 4 Schlüssel (1966), as Irene Quinn
 The Strangler of the Tower (1966)
 Ballad of a Gunman (1967), as Maruja's Mother
 1900 (1976), as Amelia
 Uncle Silas (1977, TV miniseries), as Madame Rougierre
 Fedora (1977), as Nurse
  (2003), as Frau im Circus
 3096 Days (2013), as Grandmother

Awards
 1989: Officer's Cross of the Order of Merit of the Federal Republic of Germany
 1995: Medal of Baden-Württemberg
 2013:  in the category "Starker Auftritt" for In den besten Jahren

References

External links 

 
 

1930 births
2019 deaths
German film actresses
Actors from Szczecin
People from the Province of Pomerania
Officers Crosses of the Order of Merit of the Federal Republic of Germany
Recipients of the Order of Merit of Baden-Württemberg
German stage actresses
German television actresses
20th-century German actresses
21st-century German actresses